The Mnong language (also known as Pnong or Bunong) (Bunong: ឞូន៝ង) belongs to the Austro-Asiatic language family.  It is spoken by the different groups of Mnong in Vietnam and a Pnong group in Cambodia.

Distribution
In Vietnam, Mnong is spoken in the districts of Đăk Song, Đăk Mil, Đăk R'Lấp, Krông Nô, Gia Nghĩa, and other nearby locations in Đắk Nông Province (Nguyễn & Trương 2009).

Varieties
According to Ethnologue, four major dialects exist: Central, Eastern and Southern Mnong (all spoken in Vietnam), and Kraol (spoken in Cambodia). Within a dialect group, members do not understand other dialects. The Mnong language was studied first by the linguist Richard Phillips in the early 1970s.

Lê, et al. (2014:234-235) lists the following subgroups of Mnong and their respective locations.
Mnông Gar: in northwestern Lâm Đồng Province and southern Lak Lake.
Mnông Nong: in Đắk Nông District and Đắk Min District
Mnông Kuênh: in Krông Pắk District
Mnông Pré: mainly in Đắk Nông District and Đắk Min District, and a few at Lak Lake.
Mnông Prâng: scattered in Đắk Nông District and Đắk Min District, and a few in southern Lak Lake and in Bản Đon, Ea Súp District.
Mnông Rlâm: in Lắk District. Many have close relationships with the Ê-đê people.
Mnông Bu-đâng: in Bản Đon, Ea Súp District
Mnông Chỉl: in Lắk District. Many have close relationships with the Ê-đê people. Some also live in Lạc Dương District and Đức Trọng District of Lâm Đồng Province.
Mnông Bu Nor: in Đắk Nông District and Đắk Min District
Mnông Dih Bri: very small population in Đắk Nông District; Êa Krông.
Mnông Đíp: Đắk Min District and the northern part of former Sông Bé Province.
Mnông Biat: small population in former Sông Bé Province. Majority living around the Vietnam-Cambodia border.
Mnông Bu Đêh: in former Sông Bé Province and Đắk Lắk Province
Mnông Si Tô: a group of Mạ (Mạ Tô) people in Đắk Nông District who have become assimilated into the Mnông population ("Mnông-ized" Mạ people)
Mnông K’ah: a group of Ê-đê people scattered across Đắk Nông District, Lắk District, and M'Đrăk District who have become assimilated into the Mnông population ("Mnông-ized" Ê-đê people)
Mnông Phê Đâm: small population living only in Quảng Tín commune, Đắk Nông District.

Other minor Mnong ethnic groups include the Mnông Rơ Đe, Mnông R’Ông, and Mnông K’Ziêng.

Nguyễn & Trương (2009) cover the following M'Nông dialects.
M'Nông Preh
Kuênh
Mạ
M'Nông Nâr (Bu Nâr)
M'Nông Noong (Bu Noong)
M'Nông R'Lâm
M'Nông Prâng

Numerals
The following comparative numerals from various Mnong dialects are from Nguyễn & Trương (2009).

References

Further reading

 Blood, Henry Florentine. A Reconstruction of Proto-Mnong. Waxhaw, N.C.: Wycliffe-JAARS Print Shop, 1968.
 Nguyễn Kiên Trường & Trương Anh. 2009. Từ Điển Việt - M'Nông. Hà Nội: Nhà Xuất Bản Từ Điển Bách Khoa.

External links
Mnong at www.peoplesoftheworld.org

Bahnaric languages